Vardousia is a mountain in northwestern Phocis and southwestern Phthiotis, Greece. It is a southern extension of the Pindus mountains.

The Vardousia is drained by tributaries of the river Spercheios to the north, the Mornos to the east and south, and the Evinos to the west. The Panaitoliko mountains are to the west, Tymfristos to the northwest, Oeta to the east and Giona to the southeast.

The municipal unit Vardousia, named after the mountain, covers the western part of the mountain, and includes the villages Artotina and Dichori. The municipal unit Lidoriki covers the southern part, and includes the villages Dafnos, Diakopi, Kallio and Koniakos. The village Athanasios Diakos lies in the east, and Anatoli and Dafni in the north.

References

External links
 Greek Mountain Flora

Landforms of Phocis
Two-thousanders of Greece
Mountains of Central Greece
Landforms of Phthiotis